Len Thornson (February 4, 1933 – December 12, 2021) was a Canadian ice hockey centre.

Born  in Winnipeg, Manitoba, Canada, Thornson spent his entire professional hockey career in the International Hockey League, mostly with the Fort Wayne Komets. He also spent part of one season (1956–57) with the Indianapolis Chiefs and the Huntington Hornets. He is the IHL's all-time leading scorer with 1,252 career points.

Thornson died December 12, 2021, at the age of 88.

Awards and achievements
MJHL Second All-Star Team (1953)
MJHL Goal Scoring Leader (1953)
Turnbull Cup MJHL Championship (1953)
IHL MVP (1959, 1961, 1963, 1964, 1967, & 1968)
IHL Scoring Champion (1962, 1964, & 1967)
Turner Cup (IHL) Championships (1963 & 1965)
"Honoured Member" of the Manitoba Hockey Hall of Fame
 Jersey #11 retired by Fort Wayne Komets.

References

External links

Len Thornson's biography at Manitoba Hockey Hall of Fame

1933 births
2021 deaths
Buffalo Bisons (AHL) players
Canadian ice hockey centres
Fort Wayne Komets players
Huntington Hornets players
Indianapolis Chiefs players
New Westminster Royals players
St. Boniface Canadiens players
Winnipeg Canadians players
Winnipeg Warriors (minor pro) players
Ice hockey people from Winnipeg